FC Meshakhte (Georgian: საფეხბურთო კლუბი მეშახტე) is a Georgian association football club based in Tkibuli. Since the 2018 season the club has been a member of Liga 3, the third tier of Georgian football system.

History
Meshakhte participated in the Georgian Soviet league and twice, in 1980 and 1981, became champions. In 1964 and 1976 they also won the domestic Cup.

The club spent 13 seasons in the Soviet third division with the following combined results:

The success of the club was attributed to the large coal mine industry based in Tkibuli which financed the local football as well.

First years after Georgian national league was formed, the club played in the second division. Between 1991 and 1996 they three times finished third and once, in 1997, came 2nd. Starting from 2005, Meshakhte spent thirteen consecutive seasons in Pirveli Liga.

The 3rd place taken in Group White in 2016 has been the best result achieved in the recent period. But the next season turned out troublesome. The team produced a seventeen-game unwinning run. Three points earned in the last round saved the club from automatic relegation, although a home-and-away play-off tie ended unfavourably.   

After two years in Liga 3 Meshakhte, struggling the whole season, finished at the bottom in 2020. However, they avoided another relegation due to some changes, introduced in late January 2021, which increased the number of clubs in this league.

In 2022, Meshakhte took part in a long survival battle, but they lost a crucial game and ended up in the drop zone. Nevertheless, this time due to disqualification of another club, the Miners retained their place in this division.

Seasons

Players
As of April 2022

Head Coach
David Burkadze was appointed as head coach on 14 June 2021. Previously he was in charge of several youth teams at Kutaisi football school and also trained professional clubs such as Imereti Khoni and Sulori Vani.

Honours
 Georgian Soviet Championship
 Champion: 1980, 1981
 Georgian Soviet Cup
 Champion: 1964, 1976
 Pirveli Liga
 Silver Medal winner: 2008
 Bronze Medal winner: 1991, 1994, 1995

Name
In 1991, the club took part in the second division as Okriba only to regain the current name the next season.

Meshakhte literally means a miner. The name comes from shakhta which can be translated as a shaft in coal mine industry.

References

External links
Page on Soccerway

Facebook page

Meshakhte Tkibuli